Armando Ahuatzi (born 1950) is a Mexican painter.  He is from the state of Tlaxcala.  He has exhibited in Madrid, Mexico City, and New York City.

References

External links
Official site

1950 births
Living people
20th-century Mexican painters
20th-century Mexican male artists
Mexican male painters
21st-century Mexican painters
21st-century Mexican male artists